Voodoo SAS (also referred to as Voodoo.io) is a French video game developer and publisher based in Paris. The company was founded in 2013 by Alexandre Yazdi and Laurent Ritter. Voodoo's games, predominantly free-to-play "hyper-casual games", have been collectively downloaded 5 billion times as of May 2021. By February 2022, their apps surpassed 6 billion installs. The company has been criticised for cloning other games.

History 
Voodoo was founded in 2013 by Alexandre Yazdi and Laurent Ritter. They had been friends since high school and had previously founded Studio Cadet in 2012, a services company for websites and mobile applications. Yazdi became the chief executive officer of Voodoo, while Gabriel Rivaud acted as the vice-president of games. According to Rivaud, the company was in turmoil for its first four years in operation and opted to change its business strategy thereafter. Using data it gathered from its previous games, the company designed its newer games to attract more players. Using the Unity game engine, Voodoo tested one new game roughly every week. This method resulted in the successful release of Paper.io in 2016.

Through 2017, Voodoo quadrupled its staff count to 80 and expected to grow to 150 people by the end of 2018. In May 2018, the American banking company Goldman Sachs, through its West Street Capital Partners VII fund, invested  in Voodoo. It was the largest fundraising in the French technology sector since 2015. Yazdi and Ritter retained control of the company. At the time, Voodoo had, aside from its Paris headquarters, offices in Montpellier and Strasbourg. A development studio in Berlin, Germany, was established in December 2018, headed by general manager Alexander Willink. The studio started out with roughly ten people, looking to eventually expand to 40 employees. It later hired key employees from developers Blizzard Entertainment, King, and Mamau.

By September 2019, Voodoo employed 220 people, including 150 at its Paris headquarters. A publishing office in Istanbul, Turkey, was announced in August 2019 and is headed by publishing director Corentin Selz. This continued with the opening of a Montreal development studio in November 2019, led by Mehdi El Moussali, a former producer for Gameloft. Through this new location, Voodoo intended to expand beyond hyper-casual games. The company acquired Shoreditch-based developer Gumbug in December that year.

By July 2020, Tencent was looking to acquire a minority stake in Voodoo, which was still majority-owned by Yazdi and Ritter. Tencent acquired a minority stake to undisclosed terms in August that year. According to Yazdi, this deal would help Voodoo to extend their games into the Asia-Pacific market. Voodoo subsequently opened offices in Singapore and Japan later that month, headed by Julian Corbett and Ben Fox, respectively. The company announced an investment in Istanbul-based developer Fabrika Games in September 2020, and acquired Parisian developer OHM Games in December. OHM Games had developed four games for Voodoo in 2020, which together generated 260 million downloads. Voodoo further bought BidShake, a Tel Aviv company developing a marketing automation platform, in June 2021.

Games 
The majority of Voodoo's games are free-to-play "hyper-casual games" developed for the Android and iOS mobile operating systems. Games released by the company include Helix Jump, Baseball Boy, Snake vs Block, Hole.io, Aquapark.io, Purple Diver, Crowd City, and Paper.io. Voodoo games were downloaded 2 billion times by April 2019, 3.7 billion downloads by May 2020, and 5 billion by May 2021. In December 2019, Voodoo games had 2.6 billion downloads, 300 million monthly active users (MAUs), and 1 billion individual players. Helix Jump, developed by H8games, is Voodoo's most successful game with more than 500 million downloads as of August 2020.

External developers can submit games through an online platform for Voodoo to evaluate. The publisher has worked with over 2,000 such studios, which account for 75% of Voodoo's releases. The company finances select studios and supports them during the prototyping phase, receiving a royalty share in return. Outside of games, Voodoo developed the social media platform Wizz in 2020. As of August 2021, the platform has 1 million MAUs in the United States.

Criticism 
Voodoo has been criticised for releasing apparent clones of indie games. These include Infinite Golf (similar to Desert Golfing), Twisty Road (Impossible Road), The Fish Master (Ridiculous Fishing), Flappy Dunk! (Flappy Bird), Rolly Vortex (Rolling Sky), The Cube (Curiosity: What's Inside the Cube?), and Hole.io (Donut County). In the case of Hole.io, the game used the core gameplay mechanic of Donut County that has the player controls a hole in the ground to consume objects within the environment, progressively growing wider to be able to consume larger objects. Ben Esposito had been working on Donut County for more than five years when Hole.io released in mid-2018, before Donut County publication. In response to an inquiry from Variety, Voodoo stated that Hole.io was not a clone of Donut County, although both were in the same sub-genre of games. Varietys Michael Futter noted that these games were the only two in this genre.

Accolades 
 #20 on Pocket Gamer.bizs "Top 50 Mobile Game Developers of 2018"
 #5 on Pocket Gamer.bizs "Top 50 Mobile Game Makers of 2019"
 #16 on Pocket Gamer.bizs "Top 50 Mobile Game Makers of 2020"
 Best Publisher – Mobile Games Awards 2019
 Revelation of the Year – BFM Awards 2019
 Part of  2021

References

External links 
 

Companies based in Paris
French companies established in 2013
Tencent
Video game companies established in 2013
Video game companies of France
Video game development companies
Video game publishers